(literally: Sacred Symphonies, Book One) is a collection of different pieces of vocal sacred music on Latin texts, composed by Heinrich Schütz, published in 1629. He set mostly psalms and excerpts from the Song of Solomon for one to three voices, with various instruments and continuo. Two later volumes came, but with German texts: Symphoniae sacrae II in 1647 and Symphoniae sacrae III in 1650.

History 
Schütz composed the first collection during his second study trip to Venice. During his first visit he studied the Venetian polychoral style with Giovanni Gabrieli. Returning in 1628 after Gabrieli's death, he studied with his successor at St Mark's Basilica, Claudio Monteverdi. Schütz was in the service of the Protestant Elector of Saxony Johann Georg I, and dedicated the collection to the Elector's son, crown prince Johann Georg II, then 16 years old. The texts are mostly taken from the Bible, most of them setting excerpts from psalms and from the Song of Solomon. Schütz set the texts as concertos for various combinations of one to three voices, instruments (both strings and winds) and basso continuo.

Schütz published the collection in 1629 in Venice as his , his sixth work, and his second work in Latin. In his Latin foreword, he mentions Gabrieli, but not Monteverdi. The composer has been described as "universal", and after his  published a second work in Latin. The musicologist Matteo Messori notes: 

Schütz later composed two more collections titled  as Op. 10 and Op. 12. The general title was common at the time and was used by many composers, including his teacher including Giovanni Gabrieli who used it for his larger concertos.

Collection 
The collection contains twenty different individual concertos with numbers 257 to 276 in the SWV. The following table shows a sequence number, the SWV number, the first line of the Latin text replacing a title, a translation, an abbreviation of the text source and notes. The translations follow Emmanuel Music for SWV 257, 263, 264, a study bible for the Song of Solomon, otherwise  the King James version. Links to that bible version are provided in the next column. Note that psalm numbering and verse numbering within a psalm is different in different editions. The last column provides a link to the details about the piece from the Schütz Association, which contains the text, a translation to German, the volume in the Neue Schütz-Ausgabe, biblical source(s), and further links to the collection's history, original foreword, analysis, dedication, original cover, reception and sources.

Music 
Schütz followed Monteverdi's seconda pratica in setting the biblical texts not in the older polyphonic style, but in dramatic declamation close to the opera of the period. This approach to word setting mirrors the ideas of the Reformation in its focus on the words of scripture. The settings have been described as "eloquent, sensitive, and often sensuous".

Recordings 

The Symphoniae sacrae are part of the complete edition of the composer's works by Carus-Verlag, begun in 1992 in continuation of the Stuttgart Schütz Edition. They were recorded in 2003 with the Cappella Augustana including singers  Anna Mikołajczyk, Marzena Lubaszka, Piotr Lykowski, Krzysztof Szmyt, Robert Pozarski, Harry van der Kamp, Bogdan Makal, Walter Testolin and Gian Paolo Dal Dosso, conducted by organist Matteo Messori. They were recorded in 2016, as part of the complete recordings of works by Schütz, by the Dresdner Kammerchor and organist Ludger Rémy, conducted by Hans-Christoph Rademann, with soloists Dorothee Mields, Isabel Jantschek, David Erler, Georg Poplutz, Tobias Mäthger and Felix Schwandte.

References

External links 
 
 Heinrich Schuetz: Symphoniae sacrae I SWV 257–276 Carus
 Schütz, Heinrich / Symphoniae Sacrae I, Teil 1 SWV 257–266 / 10 lateinische Konzerte (Nr. 1–10) für 1–2 Singstimmen, 2 Instrumente und Basso continuo Bärenreiter
 Schütz, Heinrich / Symphoniae Sacrae I, Teil 2 SWV 267–276 / 10 lateinische Konzerte (Nr. 11–20) für 4–6 Stimmen (vokal und instrumental) und Basso continuo Bärenreiter

Compositions by Heinrich Schütz
Choral compositions
Psalm settings
1629 works